The Suruí River is a river of Rio de Janeiro state in southeastern Brazil.

Course

The Suruí River flows through the Suruí Environmental Protection Area in the municipality of Magé, Rio de Janeiro.
It gives its name to the Suruí district of Magé.
It empties into Guanabara Bay.

See also
List of rivers of Rio de Janeiro

References

Sources

Rivers of Rio de Janeiro (state)